Danava may refer to:

Danava (Hinduism), a race of people in Vedic mythology
Danava dynasty, a mythological dynasty of Assam, India
Danava (band), an American hard rock band
Danava (album), their 2006 debut album